Abdullah Mohannad Abdel-Rahman Al-Attar (born 4 October 1992) is a Jordanian professional footballer who plays as a striker for Al-Hussein.

International career
Al-Attar's first appearance with the Jordan national senior team was against Hong Kong in a friendly match on 23 March 2017 at Amman, which resulted in a 4–0 victory for Jordan.

International goals

References

External links
 
 
 

1992 births
Living people
Jordanian footballers
Jordan international footballers
Jordan youth international footballers
Association football defenders
Association football utility players
Sportspeople from Amman
Al-Faisaly SC players
Al-Jazeera (Jordan) players
Al-Hussein SC (Irbid) players
Shabab Al-Ordon Club players
Jordanian Pro League players